A Little Tiny Smelly Bit of... The Stinky Puffs is The Stinky Puffs first release following the band's self-titled debut in 1991.  It includes four songs recorded in the studio, followed by the same four songs recorded live at the Capitol Theater in Olympia, Washington as part of the Yoyo A Go Go Festival in July 1994.  "Pizza Break" acts as an intermission between the two recordings.  The album is notable for containing the first live performances of Nirvana members Krist Novoselic and Dave Grohl following the death of Kurt Cobain, whom the track "I'll Love You Anyway" was written about.  The live tracks also feature Ira Kaplan of Yo La Tengo.

Track listing
All songs written and composed by Simon Fair Timony and Don Fleming, except where noted.
 "Buddies Aren't Butts" (Ranaldo) – 1:56
 "Menendez' Killed Their Parents" – 1:17
 "I'll Love You Anyway" – 1:45
 "I Am Gross!/No You're Not!" – 1:20
 "Pizza Break" – 0:40
 "Buddies Aren't Butts" (live) – 1:55
 "Menendez' Killed Their Parents" (live) – 0:50
 "I'll Love You Anyway" (live) – 1:43
 "I Am Gross!/No You're Not!" (live) – 1:40

Personnel
 Simon Fair Timony – vocals
 Cody Linn Ranaldo – guitar (tracks 1–4)
 Don Fleming – guitar (tracks 1–4)
 Sheenah Fair – drums
 Eric Eble – bass (tracks 1–4), guitar (tracks 6–9)
 Jad Fair – effects
 Krist Novoselic – bass (tracks 6–9)
 Dave Grohl – drums (tracks 6–9)
 Ira Kaplan – guitar (tracks 6–9)

External links
[ allmusic.com]

1995 albums
The Stinkypuffs albums